Jahangirabad is a city in Uttar Pradesh, India.

Jahangirabad may also refer to:

Jahangirabad, Ilam, Iran
Jahangirabad, Lorestan, Iran
Jahangirabad, Khoy, West Azerbaijan Province, Iran
Jahangirabad Raj, Barabanki district, Uttar Pradesh, India
Jehangirabad, a village in Khyber Pakhtunkhwa province, Pakistan